Bear Branch is a stream in Ralls County in the U.S. state of Missouri. It is a tributary of Spencer Creek.

Bear Branch was so named on account of bears in the area.

See also
List of rivers of Missouri

References

Rivers of Ralls County, Missouri
Rivers of Missouri